Ferdinando Fairfax (born in 1766 at Shannon Hill, Jefferson County, Virginia (now West Virginia); died on 24 September 1820 at Mount Eagle, Fairfax County, Virginia) was a Virginia landowner and member of the prominent Fairfax family.

Early life 
He was the youngest son of Bryan Fairfax, 8th Lord Fairfax of Cameron (1736–1802) and Elizabeth Cary.  His brother was Thomas Fairfax, 9th Lord Fairfax of Cameron (1762–1846) and his grandfather was Col. William Fairfax (1691–1757).  George Washington and Martha Washington, who traveled to Towlston Grange  after his birth, were his godparents. Ferdinando was the heir to his uncle, George William Fairfax (1729–1787), son of William Fairfax (1691–1757), who was married to Sally Cary (ca. 1730–1811), his mother Elizabeth's sister. George William Fairfax was Washington's close friend.

Career
Fairfax served as a justice of the peace for Jefferson County, Virginia and was, at the same time, the largest slave owner in the County.

From the 1770s onward, individuals in France, Britain, and North America developed plans to colonize freed black people as a way of encouraging emancipation. These individuals proposed to form colonies in Africa, in the Caribbean, or in the American West; notable proponents include Granville Sharp of England, LaFayette of France, and Thomas Jefferson of America. One of the first such plans came from four enslaved black men in New England, who petitioned the colonial government for permission to buy their own freedom and then transport themselves to a colony they wanted to found on the African coast.

Fairfax offered his own "practicable scheme" for ending slavery through colonization when he developed his "Plan for Liberating the Negroes within the United States" in 1790. Many of these plans were similar in that they wanted the abolition of slaves to be gradual, they wanted the government to compensate the slave owners for the lost property, they wanted the government to pay to educate and prepare free blacks for life as independent people, and they wanted to colonize the freed slaves in a separate place from the white society. This was because most people at the time believed that the races would not be able to get along if they tried to live together.

Fairfax later squandered his inheritance on visionary schemes and squatters lawsuits.

Personal life
Ferdinando married his first cousin Elizabeth Blair Cary, daughter of Wilson Miles Cary and Sarah Blair. The couple had the following children:
George William Fairfax (born November 5, 1797), who married Isabella McNeil
Wilson Miles Cary Fairfax, who married Lucy Griffeth
Farinda Fairfax, who married Perrin Washington, a descendant of George Washington's brother Samuel Washington (1734–1781).
Mary Fairfax who married Rev. Samuel Hagins
Sally Fairfax
Ferdinando Fairfax II, who married Mary Jett
Christiana Fairfax, who married Thomas Ragland
William Henry Fairfax
Thomas Fairfax
Archibald Blair Fairfax

Descendants
The Union officer in the United States Navy during the American Civil War, Donald McNeill Fairfax (1818–1894), was his grandson.

References 

1766 births
1820 deaths
18th-century American Episcopalians
19th-century American Episcopalians
American justices of the peace
American people of English descent
American people of Scottish descent
American planters
American slave owners
British North American Anglicans
Cary family of Virginia
Episcopalians from Virginia
Ferdinando
People from Fairfax County, Virginia
People from Jefferson County, West Virginia
Younger sons of barons